Private Nicholas Fanning was an American soldier who fought in the American Civil War. Fanning received the country's highest award for bravery during combat, the Medal of Honor, for his action during the Battle of Selma in Alabama on 2 April 1865. He was honored with the award on 17 June 1865.

Biography
Fanning was born in Carroll County, Indiana. He enlisted into the 4th Iowa Cavalry.

Medal of Honor citation

See also

List of American Civil War Medal of Honor recipients: A–F

References

People of Iowa in the American Civil War
Union Army officers
United States Army Medal of Honor recipients
American Civil War recipients of the Medal of Honor